Chichester Festival Theatre, located in Chichester, England, is one of the United Kingdom's flagship theatres with an international reputation for quality and innovation. The following is a chronological list of the Chichester Festival production history of productions that have been staged since its inception.

1960s
1962
The Chances by John Fletcher, directed by Laurence Olivier
The Broken Heart by John Ford, directed by Laurence Olivier
Uncle Vanya by Anton Chekhov, translation by Constance Garnett, directed by Laurence Olivier

1963
Saint Joan by George Bernard Shaw, directed by John Dexter
Uncle Vanya by Anton Chekhov, translation by Constance Garnett, directed by Laurence Olivier
The Workhouse Donkey by John Arden, directed by Stuart Burge

1964
The Royal Hunt of the Sun by Peter Shaffer, directed by John Dexter
The Dutch Courtesan by John Marston, directed by William Gaskill
Othello by William Shakespeare, directed by John Dexter

1965
Armstrong's Last Goodnight by John Arden, directed by John Dexter and William Gaskill
Trelawny of the 'Wells' by Arthur Wing Pinero, directed by Desmond O'Donovan
Miss Julie by August Strindberg, translation by Michael Meyer, directed by Michael Elliott
Black Comedy by Peter Shaffer, directed by John Dexter

1966
The Clandestine Marriage by George Colman and David Garrick, directed by Desmond O'Donovan
The Fighting Cock by Jean Anouilh, translation by Lucienne Hill, directed by Norman Marshall
The Cherry Orchard by Anton Chekhov, translation by John Murrell, directed by Lindsay Anderson
Macbeth by William Shakespeare, directed by Michael Benthall

1967
The Farmer's Wife by Eden Phillpots, directed by John Clements
The Beaux' Stratagem by George Farquhar, directed by William Chappell
Heartbreak House by George Bernard Shaw, directed by John Clements
The Italian Straw Hat by Eugène Labiche, translation by Theodore Hoffmann, directed by Peter Coe

1968
The Unknown Soldier and His Wife written and directed by Peter Ustinov
The Cocktail Party by T. S. Eliot, directed by Alec Guinness
The Tempest by William Shakespeare, directed by David Jones
The Skin of Our Teeth by Thornton Wilder, directed by Peter Coe

1969
The Caucasian Chalk Circle by Bertolt Brecht, translation by James and Tania Stern with W. H. Auden, directed by Peter Coe
The Magistrate by Arthur Wing Pinero, directed by John Clements
The Country Wife by William Wycherley, directed by Robert Chetwyn
Antony and Cleopatra by William Shakespeare, directed by Peter Dews

1970s
1970
Peer Gynt by Henrik Ibsen, English version by Christopher Fry based on a translation by Johann Fillinger, directed by Peter Coe
Vivat! Vivat Regina! by Robert Bolt, directed by Peter Dews
Double bill: The Proposal by Anton Chekhov, translation by Constance Garnett, and Arms and the Man by George Bernard Shaw. Directed by John Clements
The Alchemist by Ben Jonson, directed by Peter Dews

1971
The Rivals by Richard Brinsley Sheridan, directed by John Clements
Dear Antoine by Jean Anouilh, translated by Lucienne Hill, directed by Robin Phillips
Caesar and Cleopatra by George Bernard Shaw, directed by Robin Phillips
Reunion in Vienna by Robert E. Sherwood, directed by Frith Banbury

1972
The Beggar's Opera by John Gay, directed by Robin Phillips
The Doctor's Dilemma by George Bernard Shaw, directed by John Clements
The Taming of the Shrew by William Shakespeare, directed by Jonathan Miller
The Lady's Not for Burning by Christopher Fry, directed by Robin Phillips

1973
The Director of the Opera by Jean Anouilh, translated by Lucienne Hill, directed by Peter Dews
The Seagull by Anton Chekhov, directed by Jonathan Miller
R Loves J by Peter Ustinov, music by Alexander Faris, lyrics by Julian More, directed by Wendy Toye
Dandy Dick by Arthur Wing Pinero, directed by John Clements

1974
Tonight We Improvise by Luigi Pirandello, translated by Samuel Putnam, directed by Peter Coe
The Confederacy by John Vanbrugh, directed by Wendy Toye
Oedipus Tyrannus by Sophocles, adapted by Gail Rademacher, directed by Hovhannes Pilikian
A Month in the Country by Ivan Turgenev, translated by Adriane Nicolaeff, directed by Toby Robinson

1975
Cyrano de Bergerac by Edmond Rostand, translated by Christopher Fry, directed by José Ferrer
An Enemy of the People by Henrik Ibsen, English version by John Patrick Vincent, directed by Patrick Garland
Made in Heaven by Andrew Sachs, directed by Wendy Toye
Othello by William Shakespeare, directed by Peter Dews

1976
Noah by André Obey, English text by Arthur Wilmurt, directed by Eric Thompson
Twelfth Night by William Shakespeare, directed by Keith Michell
The Circle by W. Somerset Maugham, directed by Peter Dews
Monsieur Perrichon's Travels by Eugène Labiche & Edouard Martin, English version by R.H. Ward, directed by Patrick Garland

1977
Waters of the Moon by N.C. Hunter, directed by John Clements
In Order of Appearance by Wally K. Daly & Keith Michell, music by Jim Parker, directed by Keith Michell
Julius Caesar by William Shakespeare, directed by Peter Dews
The Apple Cart by George Bernard Shaw, directed by Patrick Garland

1978
A Woman of No Importance by Oscar Wilde, directed by Patrick Garland
The Inconstant Couple by Pierre de Marivaux, translated and adapted by John Bowen, directed by Noel Willman
The Aspern Papers by Henry James, adapted for the theatre by Michael Redgrave, directed by David William
Look After Lulu! by Noël Coward, based on Occupe-toi d'Amélie! by Georges Feydeau, directed by Patrick Garland

1979
The Devil's Disciple by George Bernard Shaw, directed by Peter Dews
The Eagle Has Two Heads by Jean Cocteau, adapted by Ronald Duncan, directed by David William
The Importance of Being Earnest by Oscar Wilde, directed by Peter Dews
The Man Who Came to Dinner by Moss Hart and George S. Kaufman, directed by Patrick Lau

1980s
1980
The Last of Mrs Cheyney by Frederick Lonsdale, directed by Patrick Lau
Terra Nova by Ted Tally, directed by Peter Dews
Much Ado About Nothing by William Shakespeare, directed by Peter Dews
Old Heads and Young Hearts by Dion Boucicault, adapted by Peter Sallis, directed by Michael Simpson

1981
The Cherry Orchard by Anton Chekhov, translated by David Magarshack, revised by Philip Roth, directed by Patrick Garland
Feasting with Panthers, devised and directed by Peter Coe
The Mitford Girls by Caryl Brahms & Ned Sherrin, music by Peter Greenwell, directed by Patrick Garland
Underneath the Arches by Patrick Garland, Brian Glanville & Roy Hudd, directed by Roger Redfarn

1982
On the Rocks by George Bernard Shaw, directed by Jack Emery and Patrick Garland
Valmouth by Sandy Wilson, from the novel by Ronald Firbank, directed by John Dexter
Cavell by Keith Baxter, directed by Patrick Garland
Goodbye, Mr. Chips, based on the novel by James Hilton, book by Roland Starke, music & lyrics by Leslie Bricusse, directed by Patrick Garland and Chris Selbie

1983
A Patriot for Me by John Osborne, directed by Ronald Eyre
Time and the Conways by J.B. Priestley, directed by Peter Dews
As You Like It by William Shakespeare, directed by Patrick Garland
The Sleeping Prince by Terence Rattigan, directed by Peter Coe

1984
Forty Years On by Alan Bennett, directed by Patrick Garland
Oh, Kay!, music by George Gershwin, lyrics by Ira Gershwin, book by Tony Geiss & Ned Sherrin, based on the original by Guy Bolton & P.G. Wodehouse, directed by Ian Judge
The Merchant of Venice by William Shakespeare, directed by Patrick Garland
The Way of the World by William Congreve, directed by William Gaskill

1985
Cavalcade by Noël Coward, directed by David Gilmore
Antony and Cleopatra by William Shakespeare, directed by Robin Phillips
The Philanthropist by Christopher Hampton, directed by Patrick Garland
The Scarlet Pimpernel by Baroness Orczy, revised by Beverley Cross, directed by Nicholas Hytner

1986
Annie Get Your Gun, music & lyrics by Irving Berlin, book by Herbert & Dorothy Fields, directed by David Gilmore
The Chalk Garden by Enid Bagnold, directed by Ronald Eyre
The Relapse by John Vanbrugh, directed by Matthew Francis
Jane Eyre by Charlotte Brontë, adapted for the stage and directed by Peter Coe
A Funny Thing Happened on the Way to the Forum, book by Burt Shevelove & Larry Gelbart, music and lyrics by Stephen Sondheim, directed by Larry Gelbart

1987
Robert and Elizabeth, book & lyrics by Ronald Millar, music by Ron Grainer, directed by Stewart Taylor
An Ideal Husband by Oscar Wilde, directed by Tony Britton
A Man for All Seasons by Robert Bolt, directed by Frank Hauser
Miranda by Beverley Cross, after Carlo Goldoni, directed by Wendy Toye

1988
Hay Fever by Noël Coward, directed by Tony Britton
Major Barbara by George Bernard Shaw, directed by Christopher Morahan
The Royal Baccarat Scandal by Royce Ryton, based on the book by Michael Havers & Edward Grayson, directed by Val May
Ring Round the Moon by Jean Anouilh, translated by Christopher Fry, directed by Elijah Morrissey

1989
Victory! adapted from Thomas Hardy's The Dynasts by Patrick Garland, directed by Patrick Garland and Matthew Francis
The Heiress by Ruth and Augustus Goetz, directed by Vivian Matalan
London Assurance by Dion Boucicault, directed by Sam Mendes
A Little Night Music, book by Hugh Wheeler, music & lyrics by Stephen Sondheim, directed by Ian Judge
Summerfolk by Maxim Gorky in a version by Botho Strauss & Peter Stein, translated by Michael Robinson
Culture Vultures by Robin Glendinning
Warrior by Shirley Gee 
The Triumph of Love by Pierre de Marivaux, translated by Guy Callan
Cloud Nine by Caryl Churchill
Love's Labours Lost by William Shakespeare
The Purity Game by Gillian Plowman, music by Corin Buckeridge, lyrics by Will Cohu 
War and Peaces, a revue devised by Will Cohu and Stefan Bednarczyk

1990s
1990
The Merry Wives of Windsor by William Shakespeare, directed by Michael Rudman
The Power and the Glory, adapted by Denis Cannan from the novel by Graham Greene, directed by Tim Luscombe
The Silver King by Henry Arthur Jones and Henry Herman, directed by Peter Wood
Rumours by Neil Simon, directed by Michael Rudman
Born Again, music by Jason Carr, libretto by Julian Barry & Peter Hall, based on the play Rhinoceros by Eugène Ionesco, directed by Peter Hall
Thérèse Raquin by Émile Zola, translation by Nicholas Wright, directed by David Leveaux
Eurydice by Jean Anouilh, translated by Peter Meyer, directed by Michael Rudman
70, Girls, 70, book by David Thompson & Norman L. Martin, music by John Kander, lyrics by Fred Ebb, based on the play Breath of Spring by Peter Coke, adapted by Joe Masteroff, directed by Paul Kerryson
My Mother Said I Never Should by Charlotte Keatley, directed by Annie Castledine
Scenes from a Marriage by Ingmar Bergman, translated by Alan Blair, directed by Rita Russek

1991
Arsenic and Old Lace by Joseph Kesselring, directed by Annie Castledine
Henry VIII by William Shakespeare, directed by Ian Judge
Tovarich directed by Patrick Garland
Preserving Mr Panmure directed by Peter Wood
Point Valaine by Noël Coward, directed by Tim Luscombe
The Sisterhood directed by Tony Britton
Valentine's Day directed by Gillian Lynne
Adam was a Gardener directed by Caroline Sharman
Talking Heads directed by Alan Bennett

1992
Coriolanus by William Shakespeare, directed by Tim Supple
Venus Observed directed by James Roose Evans
King Lear in New York directed by Patrick Garland
She Stoops to Conquer by Oliver Goldsmith, directed by Peter Wood
Me and My Girl directed by Ian Rickson
Double Take directed by Hugh Wooldridge
Nijinsky - Death of a Faun directed by Jane McCulloch
Vita & Virginia directed by Patrick Garland
Cain directed by Edward Hall

1993
Getting Married by George Bernard Shaw, directed by Tim Supple
Relative Values by Noël Coward, directed by Tim Luscombe
Pickwick directed by Patrick Garland
The Matchmaker by Thornton Wilder, directed by Patrick Mason
Carrington directed by Annie Castledine
Rope directed by Keith Baxter
Elvira '40 directed by Patrick Garland

1994
The Rivals by Richard Brinsley Sheridan, directed by Richard Cottrell
Pygmalion by George Bernard Shaw, directed by Patrick Garland
The Schoolmistress directed by Matthew Francis
Noel/Cole: Let's Do It directed by Jeff Thacker and David Kernan
A Doll's House directed by Annie Castledine
Dangerous Corner by J.B. Priestley, directed by Keith Baxter
Three Sisters by Anton Chekhov, directed by Lisa Forellp

1995
Hadrian the Seventh by Peter Luke, directed by Terry Hands
Hobson's Choice by Harold Brighouse, directed by Frank Hauser
The School for Scandal by Richard Brinsley Sheridan, directed by Richard Cottrell
The Miser by Molière, directed by Nicholas Broadhurst
The Visit by Friedrich Dürrenmatt, directed by Terry Hands
Taking Sides by Ronald Harwood, directed by Harold Pinter
A Word from Our Sponsor directed by Alan Ayckbourn
Playing the Wife directed by Richard Clifford
The Hothouse by Harold Pinter, directed by David Jones
Monsieur Amilcar directed by Tim Luscombe

1996
Love for Love by William Congreve, directed by Ian Judge
Mansfield Park directed by Michael Rudman
Beethoven's 10th directed by Joe Harmston
When We Are Married by J.B. Priestley, directed by Jude Kelly
Fortune's Fool directed by Gale Edwards
Simply Disconnected directed by Richard Wilson
Talking Heads directed by Alan Bennett
Uncle Vanya by Anton Chekhov, directed by Bill Bryden
Hedda Gabler by Henrik Ibsen, directed by Lindy Davies
Beatrix directed by Patrick Garland
The Handyman directed by Christopher Morahan
It Could Be Any One Of Us directed by Alan Ayckbourn

1997
The Admirable Crichton by J.M. Barrie, directed by Michael Rudman
Lady Windermere's Fan by Oscar Wilde, directed by Richard Cottrell
Blithe Spirit by Noël Coward,
Our Betters directed by Michael Rudman
The Magistrate by Arthur Wing Pinero, directed by Nicholas Broadhurst
After October directed by Keith Baxter
Nocturne for Lovers directed by Kado Kostzer
Tallulah directed by Michael Rudman
Suzanna Andler directed by Lindy Davies
Misalliance by George Bernard Shaw, directed by Frank Hauser
Electra by Sophocles, directed by David Leveaux

1998
Saturday, Sunday ... and Monday directed by Jude Kelly
Racing Demon Christopher Morahan
Chimes at Midnight directed by Patrick Garland
Katherine Howard
Loot directed by David Grindley
Song of Singapore directed by Roger Redfarn
The Glass Menagerie by Tennessee Williams, directed by Jacob Murray

1999
The Importance of Being Earnest by Oscar Wilde, directed by Christopher Morahan
Semi-Detached by David Turner, directed by Christopher Morahan
Easy Virtue by Noël Coward, directed by Maria Aitken
The Man Who Came to Dinner by Moss Hart and George S. Kaufman, directed by Joe Dowling
The King of Prussia directed by Sean Holmes
Insignificance directed by Loveday Ingram
Nymph Errant music and lyrics by Cole Porter, libretto by Romney Brent, from the novel by James Laver, directed by Roger Redfarn
The School of Night directed by Jack Shepherd
The Retreat from Moscow directed by Christopher Morahan

2000s
2000
The Recruiting Officer directed by James Kerr
Heartbreak House by George Bernard Shaw, directed by Christopher Morahan
A Small Family Business
Arcadia directed by Peter Wood
The Sea directed by Sean Holmes
The Blue Room directed by Loveday Ingram
Pal Joey music by Richard Rodgers, lyrics by Lorenz Hart, book by John O’Hara, directed by Loveday Ingram
Aristocrats directed by Sean Holmes
Hysteria directed by Loveday Ingram

2001
On the Razzle directed by Peter Wood
The Winslow Boy directed by Christopher Morahan
My One and Only directed by Loveday Ingram
Three Sisters by Anton Chekhov, directed by Loveday Ingram
Song of Singapore directed by Roger Redfarn
Shang-a-Lang directed by Andy Brereton
In Celebration directed by Sean Holmes
The Secret Rapture directed by Indhu Rubasingham
Pulling It Together directed by Edward Hall
Alice's Adventures directed by Dale Rooks

2002
The Front Page by Ben Hecht and Charles MacArthur, directed by Edward Kemp
Wild Orchids directed by Edward Kemp
Cabaret book by Joe Masteroff, lyrics by Fred Ebb, music by John Kander, directed by Roger Redfarn
Romeo and Juliet by William Shakespeare, directed by Indhu Rubasingham
The Lady's Not for Burning directed by Samuel West
Up on the Roof directed by Angus Jackson
Blunt Speaking directed by Mark Clements
Songs of the Western Men directed by Andy Brereton
Dead Funny directed by Loveday Ingram

2003
The Gondoliers music by Arthur Sullivan, libretto by W. S. Gilbert, directed by Martin Duncan
The Merchant of Venice by William Shakespeare, directed by Gale Edwards
The Waterbabies music and lyrics by Jason Carr, book by Gary Yershon – directed by Jeremy Sams
The Seagull by Anton Chekhov, directed by Steven Pimlott
Nathan the Wise directed by Steven Pimlott
Holes in the Skin directed by Simon Usher
The Coffee House directed by Simon Gonella
I Caught My Death in Venice directed by Martin Duncan
Pinocchio by Brian Way, directed by Dale Rooks

2004
Out of This World directed by Martin Duncan
A Midsummer Night's Dream by William Shakespeare, directed by Gale Edwards
Just So directed by Anthony Drewe
The Master and Margarita translation by Edward Kemp – directed by Steven Pimlott
Seven Doors by Botho Strauß, translated by Jeremy Sams – directed by Martin Duncan
Cruel and Tender directed by Luc Bondy
Three Women and a Piano Tuner directed by Samuel West
Doctor Faustus directed by Martin Duncan, Edward Kemp and Dale Rooks

2005
How to Succeed in Business Without Really Trying directed by Martin Duncan
Scapino, or The Trickster directed by Silviu Pucarete
The Government Inspector by Nikolai Gogol, directed by Martin Duncan
5/11 by Edward Kemp – directed by Steven Pimlott
Six Pictures of Lee Miller Music and lyrics by Jason Carr, book by Edward Kemp – directed by Anthony Van Laast
King Lear by William Shakespeare, directed by Steven Pimlott
The Scarlet Letter directed by Phyllis Nagy
Arabian Nights directed by Dale Rooks

2006
Entertaining Angels directed by Alan Strachan
Carousel by Richard Rodgers and Oscar Hammerstein II, directed by Angus Jackson
The Life and Adventures of Nicholas Nickleby parts 1 & 2 directed by Jonathan Church and Philip Franks
Pravda directed by Jonathan Church
Peter Pan directed by Dale Rooks
In Praise of Love directed by Philip Wilson
Tonight at 8.30 Parts I & II directed by Lucy Bailey
The Father directed by Angus Jackson
Grimm Tales directed by Dale Rooks

2007
The Last Confession directed by David Jones
Babes in Arms by Richard Rodgers and Lorenz Hart, directed by Martin Connor
Twelfth Night by William Shakespeare, directed by Philip Franks
Hobson's Choice directed by Jonathan Church
The Life and Adventures of Nicholas Nickleby parts 1 & 2 directed by Jonathan Church and Philip Franks
James and the Giant Peach directed by Dale Rooks
Office Suite directed by Edward Kemp
Macbeth by William Shakespeare, directed by Rupert Goold
The Waltz of the Toreadors by Jean Anouilh, translated by Lucienne Hill, directed by Lindsay Posner
I am Shakespeare directed by Matthew Warchus and Mark Rylance

2008
The Cherry Orchard by Anton Chekhov directed by Philip Franks
The Music Man by Meredith Willson directed by Rachel Kavanaugh
The Circle by Somerset Maugham directed by Jonathan Church
Calendar Girls by Tim Firth directed by Hamish McColl
Funny Girl by Isobel Lennart directed by Angus Jackson
Six Characters in Search of an Author by Luigi Pirandello directed by Rupert Goold
Taking Sides by Ronald Harwood directed by Philip Franks
Collaboration by Ronald Harwood directed by Philip Franks
Aristo by Martin Sherman directed by Nancy Meckler

2009
The Last Cigarette by Simon Gray and Hugh Whitemore directed by Richard Eyre
Hay Fever by Noël Coward directed by Nikolai Foster
Taking Sides by Ronald Harwood directed by Philip Franks
Collaboration by Ronald Harwood directed by Philip Franks
Cyrano de Bergerac by Edmond Rostand directed by Trevor Nunn
Wallenstein by Friedrich Schiller directed by Angus Jackson
Oklahoma! by Rodgers & Hammerstein directed by John Doyles
The House of Special Purpose by Heidi Thomas directed by Howard Davies
The Grapes of Wrath by John Steinbeck, adapted by Frank Galati directed by Jonathan Church
ENRON by Lucy Prebble directed by Rupert Goold
Separate Tables by Terence Rattigan directed by Philip Franks

2010s
2010
Bingo by Edward Bond directed by Angus Jackson
Yes, Prime Minister by Antony Jay and Jonathan Lynn directed by Jonathan Lynn
Love Story by Erich Segal music by Howard Goodall directed by Rachel Kavanaugh
42nd Street music by Harry Warren directed by Paul Kerryson
The Critic and The Real Inspector Hound by Richard Brinsley Sheridan and Tom Stoppard directed by Jonathan Church
Pygmalion by George Bernard Shaw directed by Philip Prowse
The Ragged Trousered Philanthropists by Robert Tressell directed by Christopher Morahan
The Master Builder by Henrik Ibsen directed by Philip Franks
ENRON by Lucy Prebble directed by Rupert Goold
A Month In The Country by Ivan Turgenev directed by Jonathan Kent
The Firework-Maker's Daughter by Philip Pullman directed by Dale Rooks

2011
Rosencrantz & Guildenstern Are Dead by Tom Stoppard
Singin' in the Rain book by Betty Comden and Adolph Green, lyrics by Arthur Freed, and music by Nacio Herb Brown
The Deep Blue Sea by Terence Rattigan
Rattigan's Nijinsky by Nicholas Wright
Sweeney Todd music and lyrics by Stephen Sondheim and libretto by Hugh Wheeler
She Loves Me book by Joe Masteroff, lyrics by Sheldon Harnick, and music by Jerry Bock
Top Girls by Caryl Churchill
The Syndicate by Eduardo De Filippo, in a new version by Mike Poulton
South Downs by David Hare

2012
Uncle Vanya – by Anton Chekhov
The Way of the World – by William Congreve
A Marvellous Year for Plums by Hugh Whitemore
Canvas by Michael Wynne
Kiss Me, Kate – book by Samuel and Bella Spewack –  music and lyrics by Cole Porter
The Resistible Rise of Arturo Ui – by Bertolt Brecht
Heartbreak House by George Bernard Shaw
Noah by Rachel Barnett
Surprises by Alan Ayckbourn
Absurd Person Singular by Alan Ayckbourn
Private Lives – by Noël Coward
Antony and Cleopatra – by William Shakespeare

2013
The Pajama Game – music by Richard Adler and Jerry Ross
If Only – by David Edgar
Barnum – by Mark Bramble, lyrics by Michael Stewart, music by Cy Coleman
The Resistible Rise of Arturo Ui – by Bertolt Brecht
Neville's Island – by Tim Firth
Another Country – by Julian Mitchell
The Witches – by Roald Dahl

2014
Stevie – by Hugh Whitemore 
Pressure – by David Haig 
Miss Julie – by August Strindberg, in a new version by Rebecca Lenkiewicz
Black Comedy – by Peter Shaffer
Amadeus – by Peter Shaffer
Guys and Dolls – music and lyrics by Frank Loesser book by Jo Swerling and Abe Burrows
Taken at Midnight – by Mark Hayhurst
Gypsy – book by Arthur Laurents music by Jule Styne lyrics by Stephen Sondheim
Frankie and Johnny in the Clair de Lune – by Terrence McNally
An Ideal Husband – by Oscar Wilde
The Hundred and One Dalmatians – by Dodie Smith in a new adaptation by Bryony Lavery

2015
Way Upstream – by Alan Ayckbourn
Educating Rita – by Willy Russell
The Rehearsal – by Jean Anouilh, in a new adaptation by Jeremy Sams
Mack and Mabel
For Services Rendered – by Somerset Maugham
Someone Who'll Watch Over Me – by Frank McGuinness
A Damsel in Distress – based on a novel by PG Wodehouse, with songs by George and Ira Gershwin
Young Chekhov trilogy – Platonov, Ivanov and The Seagull

2016
Travels with My Aunt – based on the novel by Graham Greene, book by Ron Cowen and Daniel Lipman, music and lyrics by George Stiles and Anthony Drewe
An Enemy of the People – by Henrik Ibsen, in a version by Christopher Hampton
Ross – by Terence Rattigan
First Light – a new play by Mark Hayhurst
Fracked! Or: Please Don't Use the F-Word – a new play by Alistair Beaton
Half a Sixpence – book by Julian Fellowes, new music and lyrics by George Stiles and Anthony Drewe, original songs by David Heneker
Strife – by John Galsworthy
This House – by James Graham
Much Ado About Nothing and Love's Labour's Lost – by William Shakespeare

2017
Forty Years On – by Alan Bennett
Caroline, or Change – book and lyrics by Tony Kushner, music by Jeanine Tesori
Sweet Bird of Youth – by Tennessee Williams
The Country Girls – by Edna O'Brien
Fiddler on the Roof – book by Joseph Stein, music by Jerry Bock, lyrics by Sheldon Harnick
The House They Grew Up In – a new play by Deborah Bruce
Grimm Tales – For Young and Old – Chichester Festival Youth Theatre
The Stepmother – by Githa Sowerby
The Norman Conquests – a trilogy of plays – Table Manners, Living Together, Round and Round the Garden – by Alan Ayckbourn
King Lear – by William Shakespeare
Quiz – a new play by James Graham
Beauty and the Beast – Chichester Festival Youth Theatre

2018
Present Laughter – by Noël Coward
random/generations – by Debbie Tucker Green
The Chalk Garden – by Enid Bagnold
The Country Wife – by William Wycherley
Me and My Girl – book and lyrics by L Arthur Rose and Douglas Furber, book revised by Stephen Fry with contributions by Mike Ockrent, music by Noel Gay
The Meeting – by Charlotte Jones
Copenhagen - by Michael Frayn
Flowers For Mrs Harris – based on the novel by Paul Gallico, book by Rachel Wagstaff, music and lyrics by Richard Taylor
Cock – by Mike Bartlett
The Midnight Gang – by David Walliams, adapted by Bryony Lavery, music and lyrics by Joe Stilgoe
The Watsons – by Laura Wade, adapted from the unfinished novel by Jane Austen
Sleeping Beauty – by Rufus Norris – Chichester Festival Youth Theatre
2019

 This Is My Family – a musical by Tim Firth
 Shadowlands – by William Nicholson
 Plenty – by David Hare
 The Deep Blue Sea – by Terence Rattigan
 Oklahoma! – music by Richard Rodgers, book and lyrics by Oscar Hammerstein II, based on the play Green Grow the Lilacs by Lynn Riggs
 8 Hotels – a new play by Nicholas Wright
 Crossing Lines – a new play by Anna Ledwich
 Hedda Tessman – by Cordelia Lynn after Henrik Ibsen
 Macbeth – by William Shakespeare
 Sing Yer Heart Out For The Lads – by Roy Williams
 The Butterfly Lion – by Michael Morpurgo, a new adaptation by Anna Ledwich
 The Wizard of Oz – by L. Frank Baum with music and Lyrics of the MGM motion picture score by Harold Arlen and E. Y. Harburg. Background music by Herbert Stothart. Dance and vocal arrangements by Peter Howard. Adapted by John Kane from the motion picture screenplay. – Chichester Festival Youth Theatre

2020’s

2020 (Cancelled due to the COVID-19 pandemic)

2021

 South Pacific – music by Richard Rogers, lyrics by Oscar Hammerstein II, book by Oscar Hammerstein II and Joshua Logan, Adapted from Tales of the South Pacific by James A. Michener
 The Flock – a new play by Zoe Cooper
 The Beauty Queen of Leenane – by Martin McDonagh
 The Long Song – A new adaptation by Suhayla El-Bushra, Based on the novel by Andrea Levy 
 Home – by David Storey
 Pinocchio – A new adaptation by Anna Ledwich, Music by Tom Brady, From the original novel The Adventures of Pinocchio by Carlo Collodi – Chichester Festival Youth Theatre

2022
 The Taxidermist's Daughter – adapted for the stage by Kate Mosse, a new play based on her novel
 Our Generation – a new play by Alecky Blythe
 Murder on the Orient Express – by Agatha Christie, adapted for the stage by Ken Ludwig
 The Unfriend – a new play by Steven Moffat
 The Southbury Child  – a new play by Stephen Beresford
 Crazy for You - music & lyrics by George & Ira Gershwin, book by Ken Ludwig
 Sing Yer Heart Out For The Lads – by Roy Williams
 The Narcissist – a new play by Christopher Shinn
 Woman in Mind – by Alan Ayckbourn
 Local Hero – book by David Greig, music and lyrics by Mark Knopfler, based on the Bill Forsyth film
 The Famous Five – music and lyrics by Theo Jamieson, book by Elinor Cook, based on the books by Enid Blyton
 The Wind in the Willows – by Kenneth Grahame, adapted for the stage by Alan Bennett, music and additional lyrics by Jeremy Sams – Chichester Festival Theatre

2023
The Vortex - by Noël Coward
4000 Miles - by Amy Herzog
Assassins - music and lyrics by Stephen Sondheim, book by John Weidman
Mom, How Did You Meet The Beatles? - by Adrienne Kennedy and Adam P. Kennedy
The Sound of Music - music by Richard Rodgers, lyrics by Oscar Hammerstein II, book by Howard Lindsay and Russel Crouse
Rock Follies - book by Chloe Moss, lyrics by Howard Schuman, music by Andy Mackay
A Midsummer Night's Dream - by William Shakespeare
Never Have I Ever - by Deborah Frances-White
Quiz - by James Graham
A View from the Bridge - by Arthur Miller
The Inquiry - by Harry Davies
The Jungle Book - by Rudyard Kipling, adapted by Sonali Bhattacharyya

References

External links
 The Chichester Festival Theatre website
 CFT Productions
 CFT Podcast — The CHi-pod

Theatre company production histories
Theatre festivals in England
Chichester
Culture in West Sussex
History of West Sussex

de:Chichester Festival Theatre#Frühere Inszenierungen